The following are the association football events of the year 1993 throughout the world.

Events
 February 18 – Dutch club Roda JC fires head coach and former player Adrie Koster.
 February 24 – Defender Johan de Kock makes his debut for the Netherlands national football team, in the World Cup qualifier against Turkey, 3–1.
 March 24 – Ajax-striker Ronald de Boer scores a penalty during his debut for the Netherlands national football team in the World Cup qualifier against San Marino, 6–0.
 April 27 – 18 members of the Zambia national football team die in a plane crash off Libreville, Gabon. This is the worst tragedy in African football.
 May 15 – The inauguration match of J. League, Verdy Kawasaki vs Yokohama Marinos is held at the National Stadium of Japan.
 May 20 – In France, start the "Affair OM-VA" corruption scandal by Marseille and Valenciennes. One week later, on May 26, Marseille's squad win the UEFA Champions League defeating AC Milan 1–0 at the Olympiastadion in Munich. On May 29, Marseille win the French league, but are stripped of the title by the French Football Federation on September 22, with no winner assigned. In October/November the France national football team fail to qualify for the 1994 World Cup after losses to Israel and Bulgaria
 May 20 – Arsenal defeats Sheffield Wednesday 2–1 in the replay to claim the FA Cup.
 May 26 – Copa Libertadores won by São Paulo FC after defeating Club Deportivo Universidad Católica on an aggregate score, 5–3.
 August 8 – Ajax wins the Dutch Super Cup, the annual opening of the new season in the Eredivisie, by a 4–0 win over Feyenoord.
 August 26 – Manager Peter Reid is fired by Manchester City and succeeded by Brian Horton.
 September 5 – Colombia national football team pull one of the largest upsets in soccer by defeating Argentina national football team 0–5 in Buenos Aires, Argentina.
 September 22 – Dutch striker Wim Kieft plays his last match for the Netherlands national football team in the World Cup Qualifier against San Marino.
 December 12 – São Paulo FC once again wins the Intercontinental Cup in Tokyo, Japan, this time by defeating Italy's AC Milan,3–2. The winning goal for the Brazilians is scored by Müller in the 86th minute. European Cup winners Olympique Marseille (France) were suspended due to a bribery scandal in the French Championship and were replaced by runners-up Milan.
 December 18 – RKC Waalwijk fires manager Hans Verèl.

Winners club national tournaments

Africa 
 Egypt – Zamalek

Asia 
  – Verdy Kawasaki
  – Al-Arabi
  – Ilhwa Chunma

Europe
  – Partizani Tiranë
  – Austria Vienna
  – Anderlecht
  – Levski Sofia
  – Croatia Zagreb
  – Omonia Nicosia
  – Sparta Prague
  – FC Copenhagen
  – Manchester United
  – FC Norma Tallinn
  – Jazz Pori
  – No title awarded (Marseille stripped of title due to a corruption scandal)
  (Bundesliga) – Werder Bremen
  (Serie A) – AC Milan
 
 Eredivisie – Feyenoord
 Eerste Divisie – VVV-Venlo
  –  FC Porto
  for more complete coverage see 1992-93 in Scottish football
 Scottish Premier Division – Rangers
 Scottish Division One – Raith Rovers
 Scottish Division Two – Clyde
 Scottish Cup – Rangers
 Scottish League Cup – Rangers
  (La Liga – FC Barcelona)
  – IFK Gothenburg
  – FC Aarau
  – Galatasaray
  – Partizan

Central America
  – CS Herediano

North America
 – Atlante
 /  – Colorado Foxes (APSL)

South America
 
 Clausura: Vélez Sársfield
 Apertura: River Plate
  – The Strongest
  – Palmeiras
  – Colo Colo
  – Atlético Junior
  – Club Sport Emelec
  – Olimpia Asunción

International tournaments
 Baltic Cup in Pärnu, Estonia
 
 
 
 CONCACAF Gold Cup in Dallas, United States and Mexico City, Mexico
 
 
 
 Copa América in Ecuador
 
 
 
 UNCAF Nations Cup in Tegucigalpa, Honduras
 
 
 
 1993 FIFA World Youth Championship in Australia
 
 
 
 FIFA U-17 World Championship in Japan

National team results

Europe



Births

January
 1 January: Jon Flanagan, English footballer
 4 January: Vladyslav Kalitvintsev, Ukrainian footballer
 14 January: Daniel Bessa, Italian-Brazilian junior international
 15 January: Niko Kata, Spanish-born Equatoguinean international 
 19 January: Mike Thalassitis, English-Cypriot footballer and television personality (d. 2019)
 25 January: Kasper Larsen, Danish footballer

February
 2 February: Ravel Morrison, British-born Jamaican footballer
 3 February: Vanessa Fernández, Dominican footballer
 5 February: Gerard Bieszczad, Polish footballer
 7 February: Diego Laxalt, Uruguayan footballer
 9 February: Niclas Füllkrug, German youth international
 15 February: Geoffrey Kondogbia, French-Central African footballer 
 19 February: Mauro Icardi, Argentine footballer 
 28 February: Éder Álvarez Balanta, Colombian international footballer

March
 1 March: Josh McEachran, English junior international
 7 March
Leonid Akulinin, Ukrainian footballer
Sultan Al-Deayea, Saudi Arabian footballer
Diego Chávez, Peruvian footballer
Mary Earps, British footballer
Kenneth Farrow, American footballer
Vinícius Freitas, Brazilian footballer
João Tiago Serrão Garcês, Portuguese footballer
Gilberto, Brazilian footballer
Óscar Ignacio Hernández, Chilean footballer
Saad Hussain, Qatari footballer
Jackson Irvine, Australian footballer
Matt Jones, American footballer
Anton Kotlyar, Ukrainian footballer
Santy Ngom, Senegalese footballer
Mohamed Ouattara, Burkinabé footballer
Shawn Parker, German footballer
Robbie Thomson, Scottish footballer
 9 March - Larnell Cole, English footballer
 19 March
Mateusz Szwoch, Polish midfielder
Hakim Ziyech, Moroccan and Dutch international
 31 March – Connor Wickham, English footballer

April
 1 April: Andy Brennan, Australian footballer
 11 April: Yuji Takahashi, Japanese footballer
 19 April: Lia Wälti, Swiss footballer

May
 May 20: Juanmi, Spanish international
 May 25: Andrés Felipe Roa, Colombian international
 May 27: Mikel Agu, Nigerian international

June
 5 June: Juraj Maretić, Croatian footballer
 11 June: Ciara Grant, Irish footballer
 13 June: Thomas Partey, Ghanaian footballer

July
 5 July: Mehdi Tarfi, Belgian footballer
 8 July: Shahrul Saad, Malaysian footballer
 10 July: Tiago Ferreira, Portuguese footballer 
 13 July: Daniel Bentley, English club footballer
 18 July: Nabil Fekir, French footballer
 27 July:
Omer Atzili, Israeli footballer 
Max Power, English footballer
 28 July: Harry Kane, English footballer

August
 4 August: Saido Berahino, English footballer 
 20 August: Mario Jelavic, Croatian junior international
 30 August: Paco Alcácer, Spanish international
 31 August: Pablo Marí, Spanish club footballer

September
 1 September: Mario Lemina, Gabonese–French footballer
 16 September: Aleksandar Mitrović, Serbian footballer
 27 September: Lisandro Magallán, Argentine footballer

October
 6 October: Joe Rafferty, English-born Irish footballer

November
 16 November: Nelson Semedo, Portuguese international

Deaths

January
 January 9 – Mario Genta, Italian midfielder, winner of the 1938 FIFA World Cup. (80)
 January 13 – Edivaldo, Brazilian forward, Brazilian squad member at the 1986 FIFA World Cup and active player of Clube Atlético Taquaritinga . (30 ; car crash)
 January 21 - Felice Borel, Italian forward, winner of the 1934 FIFA World Cup and topscorer of the 1932-33 Serie A and 1933-34 Serie A.  (78)

February
 February 11 – Félix Ruiz (52), Spanish footballer

March
 March 15 – Karl Mai, West-German midfielder, winner of the 1954 FIFA World Cup. (64)

April
 April 30 – Mario Evaristo, Argentine midfielder, runner up of the 1930 FIFA World Cup, part of the first sibling to play in a World Cup Final. (84)

May
 May 6 – Rommel Fernandez (27), Panamanian footballer
 May 28 – Ugo Locatelli, Italian midfielder, winner of the 1938 FIFA World Cup. (77)

October
 October 4 - Jim Holton (43), Scottish international footballer
 October 14 – Harald Hennum (65), Norwegian footballer

November
 November 26 - Guido Masetti, Italian goalkeeper, winner of the 1934 FIFA World Cup and 1938 FIFA World Cup.  (86)

December
 December 26 – Carlos Antonio Muñoz (29), Ecuadorian footballer

References

 
Association football by year